Vernon Regional Airport  is a small, non-towered airport located  southwest of Vernon, British Columbia, Canada.

It is one of the few airports in the Okanagan Valley that can offer skydiving because all commercial operators must give written consent to a skydiving company for skydiving to occur, something which is not feasible at a larger airport like Kelowna International Airport.

See also
 List of airports in the Okanagan

References

External links
 
Official site

Vernon, British Columbia
Certified airports in British Columbia
Airports in the Okanagan